The black-headed worm lizard (Amphisbaena nigricauda) is a species of worm lizards, which is endemic to Brazil.

Etymology
The specific name, nigricauda, is Latin for "black tail".

Geographic range
It is found in the Southeast Region of Brazil in the Brazilian state of Espírito Santo.

See also
 List of reptiles of Brazil

References

Further reading
Gans, C. 1966. Studies on Amphisbaenids (Amphisbaenia, Reptilia). 3. The small species from South America commonly identified as Amphisbaena darwini. Bull. American Mus. Nat. Hist. 134 (3): 185–260. ("Amphisbaena nigricauda, new species", pp. 252–254 + Plate 45 + text figures 21–28, 44, 45.)

nigricauda
Reptiles described in 1966
Taxa named by Carl Gans